Lameerea is a monotypic snout moth genus described by Jean Ghesquière in 1942. Its only species, Lameerea ensipalpis, described by the same author in the same year, is known from Zaire.

References

Epipaschiinae
Monotypic moth genera
Moths of Africa
Pyralidae genera